P. vinifera  may refer to:
 Pulvinaria vinifera, a scale insect species in the genus Pulvinaria
 Pseudophoenix vinifera, a palm species

See also
 Vinifera (disambiguation)